João Baptista Ferreira Medina is a politician from Cape Verde. Medina is a member of the Movement for Democracy (MPD) and was elected to the National Assembly from the São Vicente constituency. He is also a member of the Pan-African Parliament.

References

Year of birth missing (living people)
Living people
Members of the National Assembly (Cape Verde)
Members of the Pan-African Parliament from Cape Verde
Movement for Democracy (Cape Verde) politicians